Mike Van Sant, nicknamed "Mighty Mike", is an American drag racer.

In 1971, Van Sant drove the popular Stone, Woods, and Cook Top Fuel Pinto funny car Tinkerbell. He followed that with a ride in the SW&C TF/FC Mustang Swinndler III. 

More recently, he drove the TF/FC Mustang Invader.

Notes

External links 
Funny Cars

Dragster drivers
American racing drivers
American sportsmen
Living people
Year of birth missing (living people)